Somebody's Gotta Do It is a program that originally aired on CNN and later aired on TBN with host Mike Rowe. The show premiered on October 8, 2014. On May 13, 2016, Mike Rowe announced on his website MikeRowe.com that he and CNN had agreed to end production of the show after three seasons. A fourth season was picked by the TBN.

Format 
According to the CNN press release on the show, the show brings "viewers face-to-face with men and women who march to the beat of a different drum". In each episode, Rowe visits unique individuals and joins them in their respective undertakings, paying tribute to innovators, do-gooders, entrepreneurs, collectors, fanatics–people who simply have to do it. This show is about passion, purpose, and occasionally, hobbies that get a little out of hand."

History 

The show has its origins from a KPIX-TV news magazine segment on Evening Magazine titled "Somebody's Gotta Do It" which Rowe hosted. That segment was pitched to Discovery Channel in the early 2000s. Ultimately Discovery decided it only wanted to feature the dirty part of the segment and made a show out of it, which would become Dirty Jobs.

On May 6, 2013, Rowe posted on Facebook that he was open to creating a new show that is similar to Dirty Jobs titled Somebody's Gotta Do It. Rowe said that if half the people on his Facebook fan page said "Hey, Mike, here's 10 bucks for jet fuel and basic production costs", he'd "put the band back together and start shooting 'Somebody's Gotta Do It' tomorrow". On April 10, 2014, Rowe announced on his Facebook page that CNN had decided to air the show. Filming on the show started on May 22, 2014. On August 23, 2014, Rowe announced that it would debut on October 8, 2014, at 9 pm ET. On September 29, 2014, CNN made the first episode available to watch on their website before its debut date. On November 13, 2014, Somebody's Gotta Do It was renewed for a second season. Season two debuted on April 9, 2015. Season three debuted on September 27, 2015. After season 3 ended, CNN canceled the show and Rowe began looking for an alternative channel to air a new season of the show.

Somebody's Gotta Do It is now airing in reruns on TBN featuring one reedited half hour episode from the first three seasons. A fourth season was announced and started airing on May 26, 2018. A new episode about SkillsUSA aired on June 23, 2018 on TBN.

Series overview

Episodes

Season 1

Season 2

Season 3

Season 4

References

External links 
 
 Somebody's Gotta Do It on TBN
 Somebody's Gotta Do It on YouTube
 Somebody's Gotta Do it on MikeRowe.com
 

2010s American reality television series
2014 American television series debuts
American educational television series
CNN original programming
Documentary television series about industry
English-language television shows
2018 American television series endings